The PGA Tour priority rankings determine the order in which players qualify for open PGA Tour events (i.e. everything except the Majors, Players, WGCs, and Invitational events).

PGA Tour card
Any player ranked within the top 31 qualification criteria, excluding tournament specific criteria (category 12–17, 25), are described as having a "PGA Tour card". PGA Tour card holders gain their status via tournament wins, finishing in the top 125 in the previous season's Fed Ex Cup, or through promotion from the previous season's Korn Ferry Tour. Members in the higher categories can usually guarantee qualification for any PGA Tour tournament, in the lower categories entry can be less certain and the priority order within the category is reshuffled during the season.

Players without a PGA Tour card, but with a status within the PGA priority rankings will often have to rely on sponsor's exemptions to qualify for a tournament.

The 2020–21 PGA Tour eligibility was altered as a result of the COVID-19 pandemic as such:
 No players will graduate from the Korn Ferry Tour. 
 The Korn Ferry Tour category (27), will consist of players in the 2019-20 Top 125 category (20) and the KFT category who finished outside the Top 125 FedEx Cup places in 2019-20. 
 The Top 125 category (20) will be based upon the 2019-2020 FedExCup Points List. Players in category 1-11 in the 2019-20 season will remain in the same category for 2020-21.
 The 126-150 category will consist of players who finished in the 126-150 placings in either the 2018-19 or 2019-20, and have not qualified for any higher category.

Priority rankings

Correct as at the conclusion of the 2021 BMW Championship

Most recent reorder of categories 26 and 34 occurred after the Charles Schwab Challenge (May 30)

Reference:

Players who lost PGA Tour status during the season
Players who began the season with a medical exemption, but failure to meet the requirements meant they lost their PGA Tour status:

References

PGA Tour